Margaret or Maggie Pierce may refer to: 

Margaret Pierce, musician in The Pierces
Margaret Pierce, see List of Brigham Young's wives
Margaret Anne Pierce, see Computer ethics
Maggie Pierce, fictional character in Grey's anatomy
Maggie Pierce (actress), in My Mother the Car and The Fastest Guitar Alive

See also
Margaret Pearce, English author on science
Margaret Pearse (disambiguation)